Ernest Allen (born March 11, 1973) signed as a Free agent in 1995 to the NFL Seattle Seahawks as a defensive tackle, then signing with the NFL Europe's Rhein Fire in 1996 to the same position. Then was signed to the Arena Football League offensive lineman/defensive lineman. He has previously played for the Florida Bobcats (1996), the Albany Firebirds (1997), the Milwaukee Mustangs (1998-1999), the Orlando Predators (2000-2003), the Dallas Desperados (2004-2005) and the Philadelphia Soul (2006), completing his career with the Georgia Force (2007-2008). Ranks second in league history in tackles for loss and one of the top 10 players in league history in sacks, also being selected to five All-Arena Teams during his career. He was named Second Team All-Arena in 1998, 2001, 2002, 2003 and 2006.

High school career
Allen attended John Adams High School in South Bend, Indiana, and was a letterman in football. In football, he won first team All-State honors at defensive tackle, and second team All-League honors at offensive tackle. In his final two years of high school, he produced 10 sacks, 12 forced fumbles, 65 tackles, and six fumble recoveries on defense.

College career
Allen attended the University of Cincinnati, and finished his stellar college career with 11 sacks and 120 tackles (8 for losses). Six of those sacks, and 45 tackles came during his senior year. Was a Three year starter.

External links
Ernest Allen at ArenaFan Online

1973 births
Living people
Players of American football from South Bend, Indiana
American football offensive linemen
American football defensive linemen
Cincinnati Bearcats football players
Florida Bobcats players
Albany Firebirds players
Milwaukee Mustangs (1994–2001) players
New Jersey Red Dogs players
Orlando Predators players
Dallas Desperados players
Philadelphia Soul players
Georgia Force players